Artigas Alexis Barrios Fernández (7 July 1937 – 16 June 2022) was an Uruguayan politician.

A member of the Socialist Party of Uruguay and of the Broad Front, he served in the Chamber of Representatives from 2000 to 2005 and was intendant of the Rocha Department from 2005 to 2015.

Barrios died of pneumonia on 16 June 2022, at the age of 84.

References 

1937 births
2022 deaths
People from Rocha Department
Uruguayan people of Spanish descent
Socialist Party of Uruguay politicians
Broad Front (Uruguay) politicians
Members of the Chamber of Representatives of Uruguay (2000–2005)
Intendants of Rocha Department
Deaths from pneumonia in Uruguay